CDE & FGH v Mirror Group Newspapers and LMN  [2010] EWHC 3308  is an English privacy law case. The case was a misuse of private information claim in which two claimants sought an interim injunction preventing the two defendants from publishing private information about them.

The case is unusual in that not only are the claimants granted anonymity but also defendants and non-parties. The first claimant "CDE" is described as someone who often appears on television. The second claimant "FGH" is the wife of the first claimant. The second defendant "LMN" is described as a single mother on disability benefits who wished to sell a story relating to the claimants to The Sunday Mirror newspaper.

References

External links
Bailii

English privacy case law
2010 in law